"Good Morning Freedom" is a song by British pop group Blue Mink, released as a single in March 1970. It was released as a non-album single, but was included on the US album Real Mink. It peaked at number 10 on the UK Singles Chart.

Track listing
7"
 "Good Morning Freedom" – 2:49
 "Mary Jane" – 3:14

Personnel 
 Madeline Bell – vocals
 Roger Cook – vocals
 Roger Coulam – keyboards
 Alan Parker – guitar
 Herbie Flowers – bass guitar
 Barry Morgan – drums

Charts

Popular culture and covers 
 In May 1970, American band Daybreak released a cover of the song as their only single and it peaked at number 94 on the Billboard Hot 100.
In 1971, Australian guitarist John Williams covered the song on his album Changes.
 In 1973, British duo Peters and Lee covered the song on their debut album We Can Make It.
 In 1994, a cover by Elton John, recorded in 1970, was released on the compilation album Chartbusters Go Pop.
 In 2000, American singer Madeline Bell released her own cover of the song on her album Blessed.
 In 2009, the song featured prominently in the Breaking Bad episode "4 Days Out".
 In 2011, the song featured in an advert for skin care brand Freederm.
 In 2013, Albert Hammond released a version on his live album Songbook 2013 – Live in Wilhelmshaven.

References

1970 singles
1970 songs
Songs written by Roger Cook (songwriter)
Songs written by Roger Greenaway
Songs written by Albert Hammond
Songs written by Mike Hazlewood
Philips Records singles